HMS Alderney (P416/S66), was an  of the Royal Navy, built by Vickers-Armstrongs at Barrow and launched 25 June 1945 by Mrs Molly Wallis, wife of Sir Barnes Wallis. She was the 12th of the class and was scrapped in 1972.

Design
Like all Amphion-class submarines, Alderney had a displacement of  when at the surface and  while submerged. The submarine was powered by two Admiralty ML eight-cylinder diesel engines generating a power of  each. It also contained four electric motors each producing  that drove two shafts.

Alderney was fitted with ten 21 inch (533 mm) torpedo tubes, one QF 4 inch naval gun Mk XXIII, one Oerlikon 20 mm cannon, and a .303 British Vickers machine gun. Its torpedo tubes were fitted to the bow and stern, and it could carry twenty torpedoes. Its complement was sixty-one crew members.

Operational service
Alderney completed three commissions between 1954 and 1963 with the 6th Submarine Squadron at Halifax, Nova Scotia, carrying out exercises with the Royal Canadian Navy and Royal Canadian Air Force. In September 1952  replaced the damaged Alderney, which had developed issues while training with vessels of the Royal Canadian Navy off Bermuda. She was modernised during a long refit in Portsmouth Dockyard between 1956 and 1958. In 1965 and 1966 she was present at Portsmouth Navy Days. She was decommissioned in 1966 and was broken up at Troon, Scotland on 1 February 1970.

References

Publications

External links
 Pictures of HMS Alderney at MaritimeQuest

 

Amphion-class submarines
Cold War submarines of the United Kingdom
Ships built in Barrow-in-Furness
1945 ships